Khaled Falah (born 4 April 1972) is a Syrian boxer. He competed in the men's flyweight event at the 1996 Summer Olympics.

References

External links
 

1972 births
Living people
Syrian male boxers
Olympic boxers of Syria
Boxers at the 1996 Summer Olympics
Place of birth missing (living people)
Flyweight boxers
20th-century Syrian people